The Gobosh 700S is an American light-sport aircraft that was designed by Polish designer Tomasz Antoniewski as the Aero AT-3 and was marketed by Gobosh Aviation of Moline, Illinois. The 700S was introduced in 2007 and when it was available was supplied as a complete ready-to-fly-aircraft.

By 2016 the company website had been taken down and the company had likely gone out of business.

Design and development
The aircraft was designed to comply with the US light-sport aircraft rules. It features a cantilever low-wing, a two-seats-in-side-by-side configuration enclosed open cockpit under a bubble canopy, fixed tricycle landing gear and a single engine in tractor configuration.

The aircraft is made from aluminum sheet and its  span wing mounts winglets. The standard engine available is the  Rotax 912ULS four-stroke powerplant.

Specifications (700S)

References

External links

Light-sport aircraft
Single-engined tractor aircraft
Vehicles introduced in 2007